John Robert Cuthbertson (1834–1882) was a 19th-century New Zealand politician. 
 
He was Mayor of Invercargill in 1876–1877.

References

1834 births
1882 deaths
Burials at Eastern Cemetery, Invercargill
Members of the New Zealand House of Representatives
Members of the Southland Provincial Council
Mayors of Invercargill
New Zealand MPs for South Island electorates
19th-century New Zealand politicians